"Supernova" is a song by Norwegian pop and rap duo Cir.Cuz, featuring Julie Bergan. It was released on November 30, 2012, as a digital download in Norway. The song peaked at number 5 on the Norwegian Singles Chart.

Music video
A music video to accompany the release of "Supernova" was first released onto YouTube on December 27, 2012 at a total length of three minutes and fifty-five seconds.

Track listing

Chart performance

Release history

References

2012 singles
Cir.Cuz songs
2012 songs
Songs written by Jesper Borgen